The informal economy of the People’s Republic of China refers to a range of informal economic activity that stands outside of the recognized systems of regulations, taxation, and licenses.  Although the term is sometimes understood to describe marginal, unregulated, and even criminal activity,  there is considerable overlap between the informal sector and formal economy, and the informal economy serves an important societal function in contributing to employment and economic growth.

The informal economy in China represents a large portion of domestic output, consumption and employment. Employment in the urban sector represents a major part of the Chinese economy:  approximately half of urban Chinese workers belong to the informal economy as of 2004.—a significant increase since the 1990s.  It is described as fast-growing, dynamic,  highly competitive, and it contributes substantially to economic growth. However, there are serious concerns about the lack of protections afforded to workers in the informal sector.

In addition, China is a major part of the global informal sector, producing unregulated goods for consumption in Africa, Latin America, and elsewhere. According to Roberta Neuwirth, China's rise as a global center of manufacturing owes, in part, to its willingness to trade in the informal economy, also known as system D trade. In some regions in China, local governments have adopted policies designed to encourage the informal economy to alleviate unemployment.

Development and causes
The informal economy in China, as it is currently conceptualized, arose amidst economic reforms that began in the 1970s. Prior to 1978, the centralized economy under Mao Zedong precluded the emergence of a private economy.  As the country’s economy was liberalized and reformed under Deng Xiaoping, however, the private economy was permitted to develop,  and often emerged in the form of unregulated micro-enterprises, family enterprises, or individual purveyors of goods and services.

Some of the causes accounting for the rise of the informal sector of the Chinese economy includes weak legal and social safety nets; international demand for  ‘System D’ products; economic shifts such as urbanization and the decline of state-owned enterprises.

Employment in the informal economy
By some estimates, nearly half of employment in urban China is in the informal economy. Many of these workers—approximately 120 million to 150 million — are migrant workers who are not registered to work in cities, and therefore lack a number of formal protections.

See also

Black market
Jangmadang

References

Economy of China
Informal economy in Asia